Eugen Büchel (8 August 1916 – 1978) was a Liechtensteiner bobsledder who competed in the mid-1930s. He finished 18th in the two-man event at the 1936 Winter Olympics in Garmisch-Partenkirchen.

References
1936 bobsleigh two-man results
Eugen Büchel's profile at Sports Reference.com

Bobsledders at the 1936 Winter Olympics
Liechtenstein male bobsledders
1916 births
1978 deaths
Olympic bobsledders of Liechtenstein